"If I Could Fall in Love" is the fourth single (third in the United States) from American rock musician Lenny Kravitz's sixth studio album, Lenny (2001). released on July 29, 2002, by Virgin Records America. The single was part of the soundtrack of the film Blue Crush (2002), as the main theme.

Music video
The music video features Lenny performing the song in various locations including a beach and a swimming pool. Amplifiers and speakers are set up to give the viewers the impression that they are attending a special concert. The actors of the film Blue Crush, including Kate Bosworth and Michelle Rodriguez, appear on the beach in various movie clips intertwined with the music video.

Track listing
European enhanced CD single
 "If I Could Fall in Love" (vocal up) – 4:12
 "If I Could Fall in Love" (album version) – 4:24
 "Stillness of Heart" (Amsterdam acoustic version) – 8:16
 "If I Could Fall in Love" (video) – 10:50

Charts

References

External links
Lenny Kravitz official site

2002 singles
Lenny Kravitz songs
Song recordings produced by Lenny Kravitz
Songs written by Lenny Kravitz